El Espinillo is a settlement in Formosa Province in northern Argentina. It's the exact antipode of Taipei, the capital of Taiwan.

Populated places in Formosa Province